Charles Allerdale Millsom (6 July 1885 – 21 December 1912) was an  Australian rules footballer who played with South Melbourne in the Victorian Football League (VFL).

Notes

External links 

1885 births
1912 deaths
Australian rules footballers from Tasmania
Sydney Swans players